Frank Smith may refer to:

Academia 
Frank Smith (psycholinguist), American psycholinguist, researcher of educational systems and the nature of learning
Frank Edward Smith (1876–1970), British physicist

Arts and entertainment 
Frank Smith (animator) (1911–1975), American animator
Frank Smith (General Hospital), a fictional character on the American soap opera General Hospital
Officer Frank Smith, fictional police detective, played by Ben Alexander, in the 1951 TV series Dragnet
Frank Hill Smith (1842–1904), American artist and interior designer
Frank Kingston Smith, Jr., American radio personality
Frank Kingston Smith Sr. (1919–2003), American author and criminal attorney
Frank Vining Smith (1879–1967), American marine painter
Frank H. Smith, American media executive and producer

Business 
Francis Marion Smith (1846–1931), borax mining magnate
Frank L. Smith Bank, a 1905 bank whose building was designed by Frank Lloyd Wright
Sir Frank Ewart Smith (1897–1995), deputy chairman Imperial Chemical Industries, and chief engineer of armament design for Britain during WWII

Government and politics 
Frank Smith (Canadian politician) (1822–1901), Canadian senator and businessman
Frank Smith (Florida settler), Florida state representative and settler
Frank Smith (D.C. Council) (born 1942), civil rights activist and politician in Washington, D.C.
Frank Smith (Montana politician) (born 1942), Montana state senator
Frank Smith (Connecticut politician), member of the Connecticut House of Representatives
Frank Owens Smith (1859–1924), U.S. representative from Maryland
Frank L. Smith (1867–1950), U.S. representative from Illinois
Frank G. Smith (1872–1950), justice of the Arkansas Supreme Court 
Frank Ellis Smith (1918–1997), U.S. representative from Mississippi
Frank Smith (British politician) (1854–1940), British Christian Socialist politician
Frank Smith (New South Wales politician) (1852–1910), New South Wales politician
Frank Smith (South Australian politician) (1888–1948), South Australian politician
Frank L. Smith (New York politician) (1851–1926), American farmer and politician from New York
Frank Smith (Kansas politician) (born 1952), member of the Kansas state legislature

Sports 
Brun Smith (Frank Brunton Smith, 1922–1997), New Zealand cricketer
Frank Smith (cricketer, born 1893) (1893–1975), New Zealand cricketer
Frank Smith (1900s pitcher) (1879–1952), Major League Baseball (MLB) pitcher
Frank Smith (1950s pitcher) (1928–2005), MLB pitcher
Frank Smith (Australian rules footballer) (1905–1968), Australian footballer for Melbourne
Frank Smith (catcher) (1857–1928), MLB catcher
Frank Smith (footballer, born 1889) (1889–1982), English footballer
Frank Smith (footballer, born 1897) (1897–1988), English footballer
Frank Smith (footballer, born 1936), English football goalkeeper
Frank Smith (ice hockey) (1894–1964), Canadian ice hockey administrator
Frank Smith (rugby union) (1886–1954), Australian rugby union player and Olympic gold medalist
Frank Smith (sailor), British Olympic sailor
Frank Smith (umpire) (1872–1943), English cricketer and Test umpire
Frank M. Smith, American yacht racer
Frank M. Smith Jr. (1927–1998), American sports broadcasting executive
Frank Smith Sr., rugby league footballer of the 1930s, and 1940s
Frank Smith Jr., rugby league footballer of the 1960s
Frank Smith (Canadian football) (born 1931), played in the 1950s, coached UBC to five conference titles
Frank Smith (American football) (born 1981), American football coach

Other
Frank Elmer Smith (1864–1943), American Medal of Honor recipient
Frank E. Smith, president of the National Association of Letter Carriers

See also
Francis Smith (disambiguation)
Frank Smyth (1891–1972), New Zealand rugby union player
Frank Smythe (1900–1949), British mountaineer
Franklin W. Smith (1826–1911), American abolitionist